Conrado M. "Conrad" Vega (June 22, 1938 – December 26, 2010) was an American politician and educator.

Born in South St. Paul, Minnesota, Vega received his bachelor's degree from University of St. Thomas and taught social studies at Lakeville High School. He was the first Hispanic state senator in Minnesota. He served in the Minnesota State Senate from 1977 to 1985 as a Democrat.

Notes

1938 births
2010 deaths
People from South St. Paul, Minnesota
Schoolteachers from Minnesota
University of St. Thomas (Minnesota) alumni
Democratic Party Minnesota state senators